Zonal can refer to:
 Zonal and meridional, directions on a globe, west–east and north–south, respectively. 
 Zonal and poloidal, directions in a toroidal magnetically confined plasma
 Zonal polynomial, a symmetric multivariate polynomial
 Zonal pelargonium, a type of pelargoniums
 Zonal tournaments in chess: see Interzonal#Zonal tournaments
 Electronic musicians Zonal, previously known as Techno Animal